Chaitanya is a 1991 Indian Telugu-language action road film, written and directed by Prathap K. Pothan. Produced by Sathyam Babu, the film Starred Nagarjuna, Gautami, and Girish Karnad in pivotal roles and with music composed by Ilaiyaraaja. It was simultaneously dubbed into Tamil and Malayalam as Madras To Goa.

Plot
Chaitanya, is the chief mechanic for the upcoming Roots Challenge 1991 Automotive rally race – which starts via the route from Chennai coast to Goa coast, a route which is noted for illegal drug trade and arms trafficking. Retired Major Harischandra Prasad is the chief guest for the rally, his daughter Padmini also competes for the Roots Challenge Trophy.

Chaitanya's journalist friend Sudhakar witnesses the murder of the city D.I.G. in a park. The D.I.G.'s murder happens to have been planned by an underworld gangster. Later, Sudhakar's murdered by a gang near his garage because he witnessed the murder of the D.I.G. Chaitanya finds himself beaten by the gang after he comes to the assistance of Sudhakar. When he regains his senses, he finds himself with a revolver in his hand and in police custody, arrested and charged with the homicide of the friend he tried to assist. With evidence pointing toward his guilt, he has virtually no defense and may well spend the rest of his life in prison or be hanged. He manages to escape from the prison with the help of Chaitanya's garage assistant, Golconda (a drunkard), through the journalist's friend (Joseph) in a water tanker. Disguised as the journalist's friend, the gangster's henchman is hidden in the tanker.

The police commissioner, who is a close associate of Harischandra Prasad, attempts to solve the mysterious murder of D.I.G. and the journalist. The criminal's henchman plans to blast the water tanker and kill Chaitanya, who flees from Srungavarapukota prison in the same water tanker. But, after a battle with the henchman inside the water tanker, Chaitanya escapes and jumps from the water tanker into a lake, and the henchman dies in the water tanker explosion. Police send Chaitanya's case to CBI as they come to the conclusion that it was Chaitanya who was killed in the explosion. Chaitanya gets to participate in the One Halt Race by joining at a milestone on the route, in the guise of the garage assistant's race car. He finds out that the photographs of D.I.G.'s murder caught by his journalist friend are hidden in one of the three cars of the rally. In another twist, Padmini happens to drive the car in which 1 photograph was hidden.

How Chaitanya unweaves the mystery behind all this crime and how Padmini & Chaitanya fall in love in the process and identify the high-profile criminal adds to the rest of the plot and suspense in the film. The D.I.G. was killed by three people. According to the pictures, the guy in the brown coat is the police commissioner, who claims to be the gangster. The police commissioner forces Harischandra and Padmini to join the drug trade. Chaitanya manages to reach the commissioner's safehouse, where it's revealed that Harischandra's the high-profile criminal. Commissioner didn't know that someone else was the mafia, boss. Harischandra kills the commissioner. When Chaitanya shows up, he realizes that Padmini's father was the gangster who is responsible for the illegal drug trade, arms trafficking, DIG's murder, Sudhakar's murder, and ordered his gang to frame Chaitanya. The film ends with Chaitanya killing Harishchandra, the gangster, when he attempts to shoot him.

Cast

Nagarjuna as Chaitanya
Gautami as Padmini
Girish Karnad as Harischandra Prasad
Kota Srinivasa Rao as Commissioner KJ Prabhakar
Raghuvaran as Raana
Babu Antony as Cobra
Silk Smitha as Smitha
Chinna as Journalist Sudhakar
Nizhalgal Ravi as Smuggler
Chinni Jayanth as Smuggler
Ravi Teja as Racer
Suthi Velu as Detective
Raavi Kondala Rao as Roots Rally Company MD
P. J. Sarma
Vijayachander as DIG Ram Mohan Rao
Bhimeswara Rao as Jailor
KK Sarma as Police Officer
Telephone Satyanarayana as Doordharshan Reporter

Soundtrack

Music was composed by Ilaiyaraaja. Lyrics were written by Veturi. The music released on ECHO Music Company.

References

External links
 

1991 films
Indian road movies
Films scored by Ilaiyaraaja
Indian auto racing films
Indian avant-garde and experimental films
Fictional portrayals of the Andhra Pradesh Police
Fictional portrayals of the Tamil Nadu Police
1990s road movies
Indian chase films
Films shot in Ooty
Films shot in Goa
1991 action thriller films
Indian action thriller films
Indian nonlinear narrative films
Films about the illegal drug trade
Indian detective films
1990s avant-garde and experimental films
Films directed by Pratap Pothen
Films about the Narcotics Control Bureau